The Moldova national football team represents Moldova in association football and is controlled by the Federația Moldovenească de Fotbal (FMF), the governing body of the sport in the country. It competes as a member of the Union of European Football Associations (UEFA), which encompasses the countries of Europe.

The team's largest victory came on 18 August 1992 when they defeated Pakistan by five goals to nil. Their worst loss is 6–0 against Sweden in 2001. Alexandru Epureanu holds the appearance record for Moldova, having been capped 91 times since his first match in 2006. The goalscoring record is held by Serghei Cleșcenco, who scored eleven times in 69 matches. As of July 2019, Moldova are ranked 171st in the FIFA World Rankings. Its highest ever ranking of 37th was achieved in April 2008.

Moldova's first match of the 2000s was a 2–1 loss (after extra time) against Armenia in a Cyprus International Football Tournament. The team completed five qualification campaigns between 2000 and 2009, three for the FIFA World Cup and two for the UEFA European Championship; they failed to qualify in each. Between 2000 and 2009, the team played 90 matches and their record was 20 wins, 23 draws and 47 losses.

Matches

2000

2001

2002

2003

2004

2005

2006

2007

2008

2009

Notes 
1. The ELO ratings include an away match against Romania B on 24 May 2005 (lost 2–0), which is not included in the above table.
 Turkey were ordered to play three home matches at a neutral ground, behind closed doors after violence in their World Cup Qualifying playoff match against Switzerland on 16 November 2005.
 Greece were ordered to play two matches away from Athens after crowd disturbances in the game against Turkey on 24 March 2007.

References
All details are sourced to the match reports cited, unless otherwise specified:

External links
Moldova - International Results 1991 to 2008
Reports for all matches of Moldova national team at eu-football.info
All matches of Moldova national team at soccerway

Moldova national football team results
2000s in Moldovan sport